"Love Come Down" is a song written by American musician Kashif. It was recorded by American singer Evelyn King for her fifth album Get Loose (1982). "Love Come Down" was released in July 1982 by RCA Records as the lead single from Get Loose. In the United States, it reached number one on the Billboard Black Singles and Hot Dance/Disco charts and number 17 on the Billboard Hot 100. It also cracked the top 20 on the charts in several other countries as well.

A reggae version of the song by Jamaican singer Barry Biggs hit the top-five in the Netherlands in 1983. The song was a UK Top 40 hit in 1994 when covered by British singer Alison Limerick. In 2013, The Saturdays released a cover of the song as a B-side to single "Disco Love". In 2014, Liam Keegan released a version of "Love Come Down" featuring vocalist Julia Schlippert. Jess Glynne also performed a cover of the song on the 2015–16 edition of Jools' Annual Hootenanny.

In 2014, "Love Come Down" has been placed on Bruce Pollock's list of The 7,500 Most Important Songs of 1944-2000.

Track listing and formats
American 7-inch vinyl single  (PB-13273)

American 12-inch vinyl single (PD-13274)

Credits and personnel
 Backing vocals – Evelyn King, Kashif
 Guitar – Ira Siegel
 Drums – Leslie Ming 
 OB-X handclaps – Kashif, Steve Goldman
 Percussion instrument – Bashiri Johnson
 Acoustic piano, electric piano (Fender Rhodes), keyboards, analog synthesizer (Oberheim OB-X), analog bass synthesizer (Minimoog) – Kashif
 Lyrics and music – Kashif
 Producer – Morrie Brown, Kashif (assoc.), Paul Lawrence Jones III (assoc.)
 Recording studio – Kashif's Celestial Sounds, The Power Station

Post-production
 Audio mastering – Frankford/Wayne Mastering Labs
 Audio mixing – Sigma Sound Studios, New York

Charts

Weekly charts

Sampling
The song has been sampled many times, including the following:
"Love Come Down" by Liam Keegan feat. Julia Schlippert (2014)
"High Come Down" by Chico & Coolwadda (2001) features an interpolation King's recording.

See also
List of number-one dance singles of 1982 (U.S.)
List of number-one R&B singles of 1982 (U.S.)

References

[ Evelyn "Champagne" King discography at Billboard.com]

External links
 

1982 singles
Evelyn "Champagne" King songs
1982 songs
Songs written by Kashif (musician)
RCA Records singles
Alison Limerick songs